The W.F. Hitchcock House is a historic two-and-a-half-story house in Lincoln, Nebraska. It was built with gray stucco in 1922 for William F. Hitchcock and his wife Birdie. It was designed in the Colonial Revival style by Jesse Boaz Miller, an architect who designed many houses and structures in Nebraska. It has been listed on the National Register of Historic Places since December 5, 2002.

References

		
National Register of Historic Places in Lincoln, Nebraska
Colonial Revival architecture in Nebraska
Houses completed in 1922